Sagamore Hills Township is one of the nine townships of Summit County, Ohio, United States.  The 2020 US Census population was 10,845 people in the township.

Geography
Located in the northwestern part of the county, it borders the following townships and municipalities:
Walton Hills - north
Northfield - northeast
Northfield Center Township - east
Boston Township - south
Brecksville - west
Independence - northwest corner
Valley View - northwest, east of Independence

No municipalities are located in Sagamore Hills Township.

Name and history
It is the only Sagamore Hills Township statewide.

Government
The township is governed by a three-member board of trustees, who are elected in November of odd-numbered years to a four-year term beginning on the following January 1. Two are elected in the year after the presidential election and one is elected in the year before it. There is also an elected township fiscal officer, who serves a four-year term beginning on April 1 of the year after the election, which is held in November of the year before the presidential election. Vacancies in the fiscal officership or on the board of trustees are filled by the remaining trustees.

Schools
Sagamore Hills is part of the Nordonia Hills school system. Rushwood Elementary is located in Sagamore Hills.

Services
Emergency services are provided by the Sagamore Hills Police Department and the Macedonia Fire Department.  Macedonia Fire Station 2 (2220) Sagamore Hills division responds to 911 calls within Sagamore Hills and has two squads, an engine, a command vehicle, and an all terrain vehicle.

See also
Lawrence Upper School

References

External links

 http://www.towncharts.com/Ohio/Demographics/Sagamore-Hills-township-OH-Demographics-data.html
Official website
County website

Townships in Summit County, Ohio
Townships in Ohio